Unity Operating System (also known as Unified Operating System or UOS) is a Chinese Linux distribution developed by UnionTech based on Deepin, which is based on Debian. It is used in China as part of a government initiative beginning in 2019 to replace foreign-made software such as Microsoft Windows with domestic products.

Development 
Three versions are currently under development, a desktop for regular users (Deepin), another for enterprises (UOS) and a server version (UOS). A first stable version was released on 14 January 2020.

Support 
The operating system is primarily aimed at the Chinese market and is intended to replace Microsoft Windows in the country by 2022, also known as "3-5-2 policy". So far, the focus has therefore been primarily on in house hardware such as that from the semiconductor company Zhaoxin. There the whole KX-6000 series is already supported by the desktop version as well as the KH-30000 series for server version.

Broad support is planned, so platforms such as Loongson, Sunway or ARM are also to be supported.

See also
 Astra Linux
 Kylin OS
 Deepin
 Red Star OS
 Nova
 List of Debian-based Linux distributions

References

External links
 UOS
 UnionTech

Chinese brands
Chinese-language Linux distributions
X86-64 Linux distributions
2020 software
State-sponsored Linux distributions
Linux distributions